Tayabas is a city in the Philippines.

Tayabas may also refer to the following places in the Philippines:

 Quezon, formerly known as Tayabas Province
 Tayabas Bay
 Tayabas Isthmus